Goomalling is a townsite in the Wheatbelt region of Western Australia, 45 kilometres north-north-east of Northam, Western Australia.

The surrounding areas produce wheat and other cereal crops. The town is a receival site for Cooperative Bulk Handling.

History
The name Goomalling was first shown for a spring found by explorers Hillman and Lefroy in 1846. Hillman noted on his plan "rich grassy country", and squatters subsequently moved into the area. George Slater was the first in the Goomalling area, establishing a property around Goomalling Spring in the early 1850s.

The Goomalling Agricultural Hall was opened in 1898 by John Dempster MLC, who stood in for the Commissioner of Crown Lands, George Throssell, who was unable to make it to the event.

When the Northam – Goomalling railway line was opened in 1902 the government decided to establish a townsite at Goomalling. It was gazetted in 1903. Goomalling is an Aboriginal word that means "the place of the silver-grey possum". Goomal is the Noongar word for this possum.

An annual motor race meeting was held each year from 1949 to 1955, using a circuit that ran anti-clockwise along Railway Terrace-Lockyer St-Quinlan St-Forrest St-Eaton St-Throssell St-Railway Terrace. The meetings featured short sprints and handicaps for cars and motorcycles, with the feature race being a 50-mile handicap for racing cars.

Climate

References

External links
 Shire of Goomalling website
 2004 photo tour of motor racing circuit

Towns in Western Australia
Wheatbelt (Western Australia)
Grain receival points of Western Australia